Millner may refer to:

Places
Millner, Northern Territory, Australia
Electoral division of Millner, Northern Territory, Australia
TG Millner Field, Australia

Other uses
Millner (surname)

See also
 Robert Millner Shackleton
 Milner (disambiguation)
 Millinery, the proper name for the maker of hats